KPGA may refer to:

 KPGA (FM), a radio station (91.9 FM) licensed to Morton, Texas, United States
 Page Municipal Airport (ICAO code KPGA)
 KPGA Championship, organised by the Korea Professional Golfers' Association (KPGA)
 MBCGame StarCraft League KPGA Tour, former Korea e-sports competition